Lạng Giang is a rural district of Bắc Giang province in the Northeast region of Vietnam. As of 2019 the district had a population of 216,996. The district covers an area of 246 km². The district capital lies at Vôi.

Administrative divisions
The district is split administratively into the townships of Vôi, Kép and the rural communes of: Thái Đào, Đại Lâm, Tân Dĩnh, Xương Lâm, Tân Hưng, Hương Sơn, Xuân Hương, Mỹ Thái, Tân Thanh, Mỹ Hà, Tiên Lục, Đào Mỹ, An Hà, Hương Lạc, Nghĩa Hưng, Nghĩa Hòa, Quang Thịnh, Dương Đức and Yên Mỹ.

References

Districts of Bắc Giang province